Espionage (German: Spionage) is a 1955 Austrian historical spy drama film directed by Franz Antel and starring Ewald Balser, Barbara Rütting and Gerhard Riedmann. It was shot at the Sievering Studios and on location in Vienna. The film's sets were designed by the art director Felix Smetana. It was based on the real story of Alfred Redl, an officer serving with Austrian Military Intelligence who was also secretly spying for the hostile Russian Empire before the First World War.

Cast
 Ewald Balser as 	Oberst Redl
 Barbara Rütting as 	Nadeschda
 Gerhard Riedmann as 	Hauptmann Angelis
 Oskar Werner as 	Leutnant Zeno von Baumgarten
 Marte Harell as 	Gräfin Lichtenfels
 Hannelore Bollmann as 	Pauline von Heymeneck
 Rudolf Forster as 	Chef des Generalstabes, von Heymeneck
 Attila Hörbiger as 	Dr. Hartmuth
 Erik Frey as 	Oberst Rabansky
 Heinz Moog as 	Baron Letten
 Karl Ehmann as 	Leopold, Diener bei Lichtenfels
 Hermann Erhardt as 	Steidl
 C.W. Fernbach as 	Rittmeister Weidler
 Harry Hardt as 	General Maximoff
 Kurt Jaggberg as 	Sabrenin
 Alexander Trojan as 	Baron Korff
 Ernst Waldbrunn as 	Ebinger
 Grete Sellier as Gast

References

Bibliography 
 Fritsche, Maria. Homemade Men in Postwar Austrian Cinema: Nationhood, Genre and Masculinity. Berghahn Books, 2013.

External links 
 

1955 films
Austrian drama films
1955 drama films
1950s German-language films
Films directed by Franz Antel
Austrian historical films
1950s historical films
Films set in the 1910s
Sascha-Film films
UFA GmbH films
Films shot at Sievering Studios
Austrian black-and-white films